YYU may refer to

Kapuskasing Airport in Ontario, Canada
Van Yüzüncü Yıl Üniversitesi in Van, Turkey